Stanley Fabian Allotey (born 14 November 1942) is a Ghanaian former sprinter who competed in the 1964 Summer Olympics. Allotey reached the quarterfinals in the men's 100 metres, by finishing second in his heat, but couldn't advance further. He was also a member of the Ghanaian 4x100 metres relay team, which was eliminated in the semifinals. At the 1966 British Empire and Commonwealth Games he won two gold medals, in the 220 yards and the 4x110 yards relay.

References

1942 births
Living people
Ghanaian male sprinters
Olympic athletes of Ghana
Athletes (track and field) at the 1964 Summer Olympics
Athletes (track and field) at the 1966 British Empire and Commonwealth Games
Commonwealth Games gold medallists for Ghana
Commonwealth Games medallists in athletics
Medallists at the 1966 British Empire and Commonwealth Games